La Endemoniada (aka A Woman Possessed) is a 1968 Mexican horror film directed by Emilio Gómez Muriel and starring Libertad Leblanc.

Cast
Libertad Leblanc -Female vampire
Enrique Rocha 	
Juan Miranda 	
Agustín Martínez Solares 			
Adriana Roel as Berta	
María del Carmen Rodríguez Morquecho 			
Carlos Cortés as Ricardo		
Rogelio Guerra 	
Norma Lazareno as the first victim		
Arturo Martínez 		
Guillermo Rivas 		
José Baviera	
Bertha Moss
Nora Larraga 'Karla'
Eduardo MacGregor

See also
The Female Vampire (Spanish horror film)

References

External links
 

1968 films
1960s Spanish-language films
1968 horror films
Mexican vampire films
1960s Mexican films